Kuche or Kuqa railway station is a railway station on Southern Xinjiang railway, located in Kuche, Kuche County, Aksu Prefecture in Xinjiang Uyghur Autonomous Region.

It was built in 1998 and opened in December 1999, when the railway was extended from Korla to Kashgar. It is served by trains from/to Kashgar, Turpan and Urumqi.

The station is located in Kuche which is a thriving town of oil and natural gas development of the Tarim Basin, and of tourism, as it was once the homeland of the ancient Buddhist Kingdom of Kucha.

References

See also
Kucha

Railway stations in Xinjiang
Railway stations in China opened in 1999